Tor-Kristian Lindh (13 November 1906 – 16 November 1969) was a Finnish sailor. He competed in the Dragon event at the 1956 Summer Olympics.

References

External links
 

1906 births
1969 deaths
Finnish male sailors (sport)
Olympic sailors of Finland
Sailors at the 1956 Summer Olympics – Dragon
Sportspeople from Helsinki